Seedy Jatta (born 18 March 2003) is a Norwegian football striker who plays for Vålerenga.

Starting his career in Bjørndal IF, he moved on to play youth football in Skeid—where he became a Norwegian youth international—and Vålerenga. Drafted into the first team in 2021, he made his Eliteserien debut in May 2021 against Sandefjord, and scored his first goal in June 2021 against Stabæk, He currently represents Norway U19s at international level, the rapid forward has also played in European competition, making his debut versus KAA Gent in the UEFA Europa Conference League Qualifiers, losing 4-2 on aggregate, Jatta played 152 minutes across the 2 legs.

References

2003 births
Living people
Footballers from Oslo
Norwegian people of Gambian descent
Norwegian footballers
Norway youth international footballers
Vålerenga Fotball players
Eliteserien players
Association football forwards